(Robert) Geoffrey Trease FRSL (11 August 1909 – 27 January 1998) was a prolific British writer who published 113 books, mainly for children, between 1934 and 1997, starting with Bows Against the Barons and ending with Cloak for a Spy in 1997. His work has been translated into 20 languages. His grandfather was a historian, and was one of the main influences on his work. He is best known for the children's novel Cue for Treason (1940).

Trease's children's historical novels reflect his insistence on historically correct backgrounds, which he meticulously researched. His ground-breaking study Tales Out of School (1949) pioneered the idea that children's literature should be a serious subject for study and debate.  When he began his career, his radical viewpoint was a change from the conventional and often jingoistic tone of most children's literature of the time, and he was one of the first authors who deliberately set out to appeal to both boys and girls and to feature strong leading characters of both sexes.

Life and work
Trease was born in Nottingham in 1909, third and youngest son of George Trease (1873–1932), a wine merchant, and his wife Florence Dale (1874–1955), a doctor's daughter. He won a scholarship to Nottingham High School, where he wrote stories, poems, and a three-act play; awarded a Classics scholarship to Oxford University, he found his tutors dull and after a year, left university without a degree and moved to London. Intent on becoming a writer, he also worked with slum children and joined a left-wing group called the "Promethean Society" whose members included Hugh Gordon Porteus and Desmond Hawkins.

Trease described his own childhood reading as "a diet of classist and racist historical adventure" but in 1933, he came across a translation of a Russian book titled Moscow has a Plan, in which a Soviet author dramatised the First five-year plan for young readers. Inspired by this, in 1934 Trease wrote Bows Against the Barons, a left-wing update of Robin Hood that showcased a radical approach to historical literature for young people. This included the use of modern English, rather than linguistic mannerisms, strong male and female characters, often from less privileged levels of society and meticulous attention to detail. An enduring belief in equality and fairness is a theme in many of his books, as are links between the historical settings of his novels and contemporary issues.

Bows Against the Barons was translated into Russian and sold immensely well there; his next work, Comrades for the Charter was less successful but Cue for Treason in 1940 proved enduringly popular and remains his best known work. His subjects cover a wide range of historical periods, such as The Crown of Violet, set in Ancient Greece, The Red Towers of Granada, Middle Ages, The Hills of Varna, Renaissance Europe, Cue for Treason and Cloak for a Spy, Elizabethan England, Fire on the Wind and Popinjay Stairs, Restoration London, Thunder of Valmy, French Revolution,  The White Nights of St Petersburg, the Bolshevik Revolution and Tomorrow Is a Stranger, World War II.

Trease also wrote modern school stories, including the five Black Banner novels set in the Lake District, the first being No Boats on Bannermere), as well as a number of adult novels, history, plays for radio and television, and biographies. He authored a guide aimed at teaching creative writing to young adults, The Young Writer: A Practical Handbook. He wrote three books of autobiography: A Whiff of Burnt Boats (1971), Laughter at the Door (1974), and in the last year of his life, the final part, Farewell the Hills. This was written for his family and friends, and published privately after his death.

Trease was an acknowledged influence on author Hester Burton and inspired others, including Rosemary Sutcliff and Leon Garfield. While in some ways they outpaced him, he continued to write and published 113 books before "calling it a day" at the age of 88 because of illness. Many were translated for foreign markets, including Asia and Europe. In the United States he won the New York Herald Tribune Book Award for the Children's Spring Festival 1966 for This is Your Century.

He married Marian Boyer (1906–1989) in 1933 and they spent most of their marriage in Colwall, near The Downs School, Great Malvern. They had one daughter, Jocelyne, and moved to Bath to be closer to her, shortly before Marian's death.

Works

Children's writing

Junior novels
Bows Against the Barons (Lawrence) (1934)
Comrades for the Charter  (Lawrence) (1934)
The New House at Hardale (Boys Own Paper - 2 instalments) (1934)
Call to Arms (Lawrence) (1935)
Missing from Home (Lawrence & Wishart) (1937)
Mystery on the Moors (Black) (1937)
The Christmas Holiday Mystery (Black) (1937)
Detectives of the Dales (Black) (1938)
In the Land of the Mogul (Black) (1938)
Cue for Treason (Blackwell) (1940)
Running Deer (Harrap) (1941)
Grey Adventurer  (Blackwell) (1942)
Black Night, Red Morning (Blackwell) (1944)
Trumpets in the West (Blackwell) Revised Edition 1994 (Piper) Paperback only (1947)
Silver Guard (Blackwell) (1948)
The Hills of Varna (Macmillan) US title: Shadow of the Hawk (Vanguard Press) (1948)
No Boats on Bannermere (Heinemann) (1949) (1st in Bannermere series)
The Secret Fiord (Macmillan) (1950)
Sir Walter Raleigh: Captain and Adventurer (Vanguard) (1950)
Under Black Banner (Heinemann) (1951) (2nd in Bannermere series)
The Crown of Violet (Macmillan) US title: Web of Traitors (Vanguard) (1952)
Black Banner Players (Heinemann) (1952) (3rd in Bannermere series)
The Barons' Hostage (Phoenix House) Revised Edition 1973 (Brockhampton Press) (1952)
The Silken Secret (Blackwell) (1953)
The Island of the Gods (Children's Newspaper - Serial 14 parts) (1954)
Black Banner Abroad (Heinemann) (1954) (4th in Bannermere series)
Word to Caesar (Macmillan) US title: Message to Hadrian (Vanguard) (1955)
The School Beyond the Snows (Children's Newspaper) (1955)
The Gates of Bannerdale (Heinemann) (1956) (5th in Bannermere series)
Mist over Athelney (Macmillan) US title: Escape to King Alfred (Vanguard) (1958)
Thunder of Valmy (Macmillan) US title: Victory at Valmy (Vanguard) (1960)
The House of Blue Dragons (Children's Newspaper - Serial 16 parts) (1960)
The Maythorn Story (Heinemann) (1960)
Change at Maythorn (Heinemann) (1962)
Follow my Black Plume (Macmillan) (1963)
A Thousand for Sicily (Macmillan) (1964)
The Red Towers of Granada (Macmillan) (1966)
The White Nights of St Petersburg (Macmillan) (1967)
Horsemen on the Hills (Macmillan) (1971)
Popinjay Stairs (Macmillan) (1972)
The Iron Tsar (Macmillan) (1975)
Violet for Bonaparte (Macmillan) (1976)
The Seas of Morning (Puffin) Paperback only (1976)
The Field of the Forty Footsteps (Macmillan) (1977)
Mandeville (Macmillan) (1980)
Saraband for Shadows (Macmillan) (1982)
The Cormorant Venture (Macmillan) (1984)
Tomorrow is a Stranger (Heinemann) (1987)
The Arpino Assignment (Walker) (1988)
Shadow Under the Sea (Walker) (1990)
Calabrian Quest (Walker) (1990)
Song for a Tattered Flag (Walker) Paperback only (1992)
Fire on the Wind (Macmillan) (1993)
Bring Out the Banners (Walker) (1994)
No Horn at Midnight (Macmillan) (1995)
Curse on the Sea (Hodder Children's Books) Paperback only (1996)
Cloak for a Spy (Macmillan) Paperback only (1997)
Danger in the Wings (Hodder Children's Books) (1997)

For younger readers
The Fair Flower of Danger (Blackwell) (1955)
The Dutch are Coming (Hamish Hamilton) (1965)
Bent is the Bow (Nelson) (1965)
The Runaway Serf (Hamish Hamilton) (1968)
A Masque for the Queen (Hamish Hamilton) (1970)
A Ship to Rome (Heinemann) (1972)
A Voice in the Night (Heinemann) (1973)
The Chocolate Boy (Heinemann) (1975)
When the Drums Beat (Heinemann) (1976)
The Spycatchers (Hamish Hamilton) (1976)
The Claws of the Eagle (Heinemann) (1977)
The Running of the Deer (Hamish Hamilton) (1982)
A Flight of Angels (Macmillan) (1989)
Aunt Augusta's Elephant (Macmillan) (1991)
Henry, King to Be (Macdonald Young Books) (1995)
Page to Queen Jane (Macdonald Young Books) (1996)
Elizabeth, Princess in Peril (Macdonald Young Books) (1997)
Mission to Marathon (A & C Black) (1997)

Other children's books
Red Comet: A Tale of Travel in the USSR (Lawrence) (1937)
Fortune, My Foe: The Story of Sir Walter Raleigh (Methuen) (1949)
The Mystery of Moorside Farm - also contains The Secret of Sharn and In the Blood (Macmillan) (1949)
The Young Traveller in India and Pakistan (Phoenix House) (1949)
Enjoying Books (Phoenix House) (1951)
The Young Traveller in England and Wales (Phoenix House) (1953)
Seven Queens of England (Heinemann) (1953)
Seven Kings of England (Heinemann) (1955)
The Young Traveller in Greece (Phoenix House) (1956)
Edward Elgar, Maker of Music (Macmillan) (1960)
The Young Writer (Nelson) (1961)
Wolfgang Mozart : The Young Composer (Macmillan) (1961)
Seven Stages (Heinemann) (1964)
This is Your Century (Heinemann) (1965)
Seven Sovereign Queens (Heinemann) (1968)
Byron, A Poet Dangerous to Know (Macmillan) (1969)
D. H. Lawrence, The Phoenix and the Flame (Macmillan) (1973)
Days to Remember, A Garland of Historic Anniversaries (Heinemann) Short Stories (1973)
Britain Yesterday (Basil Blackwell) (1975)
A Wood by Moonlight and other Stories (Heinemann) Short Stories (1981)
Timechanges: The Evolution of Everyday Life (Kingfisher) (1985)
Looking through History: The Edwardian Era (Batsford) (1986)
Hidden Treasure (Evans) (1989)

Adult writing

Novels
Such Divinity (Chapman and Hall) (1939)
Only Natural (Chapman and Hall) (1940)
Snared Nightingale (Macmillan) (1957)
So Wild the Heart (Macmillan) (1959)

Autobiography
A Whiff of Burnt Boats (Macmillan) (1971)
Laughter at the Door (Macmillan) (1974)
Farewell the Hills (Privately Printed) (1998)

Other adult works
The Supreme Prize (Arthur H Stockwell) Poems (c1926)
The Unsleeping Sword (Martin Lawrence) (1934)
Walking in England (Fenland Press) (1935)
North Sea Spy (Fore) (1939)
Clem Voroshilov: The Red Marshall (Pilot Press) (1940)
Army without Banners (Fore) (1945)
Tales Out of School (Heinemann) Revised Edition 1964 (1948)
The Italian Story: From the Earliest Times to 1946 (Macmillan) (1963)
The Grand Tour (Heinemann) (1967)
Matthew Todd's Journal (Editor) (Heinemann) (1968)
Nottingham: A Biography (Macmillan) (1970)
The Condottieri: Soldiers of Fortune (Thames and Hudson) (1971)
Samuel Pepys and his World (Thames and Hudson) (1972)
London: A Concise History (Thames and Hudson) (1975)
Portrait of a Cavalier (Macmillan) Biography (1979)

Published plays
After the Tempest (published in Best One Act Plays of 1938) (Muller) (1938)
The Dragon Who Was Different and Other Plays for Children (Muller) (1938)
The Shadow of Spain and Other Plays (Blackwell) (1953)

Awards
New York Herald Tribune Award for This is Your Century

See also
Rosemary Sutcliff

References

 
 

Geoffrey Trease by Margaret Meek, 1960

External links
Google Book Search for 'Geoffrey Trease'
1998 obituary from The Independent 

1909 births
1998 deaths
English historical novelists
English children's writers
People from Nottingham
People educated at Nottingham High School
20th-century English novelists
Alumni of The Queen's College, Oxford
Fellows of the Royal Society of Literature
Writers of historical fiction set in antiquity
Writers of historical fiction set in the Middle Ages
Writers of historical fiction set in the early modern period
Writers of historical fiction set in the modern age